Maurice Olender (21 April 1946 – 27 October 2022) was a French historian, professor at the École des hautes études en sciences sociales (EHESS) in Paris. His teaching focused in particular on the genesis of the idea of race in the nineteenth century. As editor, he headed the journal  and La librairie du XXIe siècle at Éditions du Seuil.

Olender died in Brussels on 27 October 2022, at the age of 76.

Scientific responsibilities 
 Cofounder of the Scuola internazionale di alti studi scienze della cultura of Modena (Italy) in 1995. Founding member of its Scientific Advisory Board (1995–2009)
 Associate professor and member of the board of the Martin Buber Institute of the Free University of Brussels.
 Member of the Steering Committee des Mishkenot Encounters for Religion and Culture, in Jerusalem.
 Member of the first editorial board, created in 1988, of the Revue de l'histoire des religions founded in 1880.
 Directed the interdisciplinary journal Le genre humain, since its creation in 1981

Selected publications 
1978: (dir.) with J. Sojcher, Le récit et sa représentation, Colloque de Saint-Hubert, Éditions Payot.
1979: (dir.) with J. Sojcher, La séduction, Colloque de Bruxelles n°1), Paris, Aubier, coll. "Les Colloques de Bruxelles", 1980.
1981: (dir.), Le racisme : mythes et sciences : pour Léon Poliakov, texts by Pierre Birnbaum, Michel de Certeau, Michèle Duchet, Maurice de Gandillac et al., Brussels, Éditions Complexe et Paris, PUF, .
1989: Les langues du Paradis : Aryens et Sémites, un couple providentiel, preface by Jean-Pierre Vernant, Paris, Gallimard et Éditions du Seuil, coll. « Hautes études »,  ; rééd. Paris, Éditions du Seuil, "Points", 1994  ; reworked and expanded edition, 2002 . This works has been translated into 12 languages.
2005: La chasse aux évidences : sur quelques formes de racisme entre mythe et histoire (1978–2005). Paris: Galaade. .
 English translation: Race and Erudition. Trans. by Marie Jane Todd. Cambridge, Mass.–London: Harvard University Press, 2009.
2009: Race sans histoire, Points Seuil n°620  (see Le Monde 17–18 May 2009) (in English: Race and Erudition: by Maurice Olender, published by Harvard University Press      
2010: Matériau du rêve, éd. IMEC, coll. "Le Lieu de l’archive", Condé-sur-Noireau.
2011: Réponse du muet au parlant : En retour à Jean-Luc Godard, Seuil, with Alain Fleischer.
2013: Le genre humain, N° 53 : Jean-Pierre Vernant, dedans dehors, Seuil, with François Vitrani.

Learned societies and prizes 
 Member of the Société de linguistique de Paris
 Member of the Société asiatique
 Crowned by the Académie française in 1990 for Les langues du Paradis, Hautes études, Gallimard/Seuil, 1989
 Prix Roger Caillois for essays in 2007 for La chasse aux évidences : sur quelques formes de racisme entre mythe et histoire, 1978–2005, Paris, Galaade, 2005

References

External links 
 Maurice Olender at La Librairie du XXIe siècle 
  Maurice Olender, Les langues du Paradis. Aryens et Sémites : un couple providentiel on Persée
 Biographical notice on IMEC

1946 births
2022 deaths
Writers from Antwerp
20th-century French historians
Free University of Brussels (1834–1969) alumni
École Normale Supérieure alumni
School for Advanced Studies in the Social Sciences alumni
École pratique des hautes études alumni
Academic staff of the School for Advanced Studies in the Social Sciences
Academic staff of the Université libre de Bruxelles
Members of the Société Asiatique
21st-century French historians
20th-century French archaeologists
21st-century French archaeologists